Arthur Wills Percy Wellington Blundell Trumbull Hill, 7th Marquess of Downshire (7 April 1894 – 28 March 1989) was an Irish peer. He lived chiefly at the family seat, Easthampstead Park within 5,000 acres in Berkshire, until the estate was sold to Berkshire County Council after the Second World War. Up to the 1920s he was the last Marquess to have connection with the family mansion with its 115,000 acres of estate in Hillsborough, County Down.

Arthur Hill was son to Arthur Hill, 6th Marquess of Downshire (1871 – 1918) and Katherine Mary ("Kitty") Hare (1872–1959), a granddaughter to William Hare, 2nd Earl of Listowel.

His siblings were Lord Arthur Francis Henry Hill (28 August 1895 – 25 December 1953) and Lady Kathleen Nina Hill (15 September 1898 – 30 Novovember 1960). He was also half-brother to Robert Laycock (18 April 1907 – 10 March 1968), the son to Joseph (Joe) Lacock and Hill's mother Kitty who had married Laycock in 1902 after being divorced by the 6th Marquess for adultery with Joe Laycock.

Arthur Hill was educated at Eton College. During the First World War he served with the British Red Cross, and became a lieutenant in the Berkshire Yeomanry. He succeeded to the Marquessate in 1918 on the death of his father, also becoming the 8th Baron Hill of Kilwarlin, 8th Viscount Hillsborough, 7th Earl of Hillsborough, 7th Viscount Fairford, 7th Viscount Kilwarlin, and the 7th Lord Harwich, Baron of Harwich. He married Noreen Barraclough, the daughter of William Barraclough on 23 July 1953, her fourth marriage, she becoming Marchioness of Downshire.

Arthur Hill, 7th Marquess, died on 28 March 1989 aged 94, and was succeeded by his nephew Robin Hill as the 8th Marquess.

References

External links
 

1894 births
1989 deaths
British Army personnel of World War I
Berkshire Yeomanry officers
Arthur Wills Percy Wellington Blundell Trumbull
Arthur 7
People from Hillsborough, County Down
People from Bracknell
Knights of St Patrick
People educated at Eton College
Berkshire Yeomanry soldiers
Red Cross personnel